The Chinese Boxer (龙虎斗; also known by its international title The Hammer of God) is a 1970 Hong Kong action kung fu film written, directed by and starring Jimmy Wang Yu. Tong Gaai was the action director. The Chinese Boxer was a box office success at the time of its release and is currently considered the first classic in the non-wuxia, Kung Fu genre, or specifically the unarmed combat martial art films that center more on training and prowess than fantasy/adventure. It would prove influential to subsequent films like Fist of Fury.

The film was followed by a 1977 sequel called Return of the Chinese Boxer.

Synopsis
A Chinese boxer takes revenge on a gang of Japanese karate thugs who decimated his martial arts school.

Cast
 Jimmy Wang Yu as Lei Ming
 Lo Lieh as Kitashima
 Wong Ping as Li Shao-ling
 Chiu Hung as Diao Erh-yeh
 Cheng Lui as Chang Da Lun 
 Fang Mien as Master Li
 Chan Sing as Ishihara
 Wang Chung as Tanaka
 Wong Kwong Yue as Sun Tung
 Wong Ching as Kume 
 Li Tung as Lumura

Home media
Celestial Pictures released the film on DVD. Paramount Pictures released the film on Blu-ray in Japan on 13 September 2013, and 88 Films in the UK.

References

External links
 

1970 films
1970 martial arts films
Hong Kong films about revenge
Hong Kong martial arts films
Kung fu films
1970s Mandarin-language films
Martial arts tournament films
Shaw Brothers Studio films
1970s Hong Kong films